Kortlandt is a surname. Notable people with the surname include:

 Adriaan Kortlandt (1918–2009), Dutch ethologist
 Frederik Kortlandt (born 1946), Dutch linguist

See also
 Cortlandt (disambiguation)